College of Science and Technology may refer to:
 Rajabazar Science College, Kolkata, India
 College of Science and Technology (Bhutan)
 College of Science and Technology (Mauritania)
 College of Science and Technology (Rwanda)